Patayin Sa Sindak Si Barbara may refer to:

Patayin Mo Sa Sindak Si Barbara, a 1974 Filipino film
Patayin sa Sindak si Barbara (1995 film), a remake of the 1974 film
Patayin sa Sindak si Barbara (TV series), a Filipino TV series based on the 1974 film